James Butler was a pioneer of the Bible College movement in Adelaide, South Australia, and was the joint founding Superintendent of Adelaide Bible Institute (now Bible College of South Australia) with his brother-in-law Sam Barrett.

Biography
James Butler was born to Richard Butler and Sybella Butler, a couple who had emigrated from Grendon Underwood to Adelaide in 1881.  Richard Butler was an umbrella maker, cutlery sharpener of scissors and knives, and china restorer by trade, and established a shop in the Adelaide Arcade. James joined his father and the family traded as Richard Butler and Sons.  James and his wife Annie had five children; Rowland, Clifford, Colin, Verna and Ruth. Rowland (1905–1971) was a missionary to China with the China Inland Mission in 1928.

Around the turn of the century Butler attended Angas College, an evangelical college that had been modeled on Moody Bible Institute and influenced by missionary Hudson Taylor. In 1905 James’ sister Laura married Sam Barrett, also a graduate of Angas College.  Butler and Barrett became close friends, thoroughly committed to the evangelical cause.

When Angas College closed in 1920, and prospects for the recently begun Chapman-Alexander Bible Institute looked dim, Butler and Barrett resolved to establish the Adelaide Bible Institute, classes for which began in 1924. The two continued as joint superintendents until the establishment of a residential college at Payneham in 1949.

References
Calvert, John David (2000), A History of the Adelaide Bible Institute

Butler, James